By-elections to the Wellington City Council occur to fill vacant seats in the City Council. The death, resignation, bankruptcy or expulsion of a sitting councillor can cause a by-election to occur. By-elections were particularly frequent in the 1980s and 1990s but have become a rarity in recent years with only two occurring since 2000.

Background
Local by-elections normally have lower turnouts than full local body elections. A noted case occurred in 1960 when a vacancy triggered a by-election which had a turnout of only 7.7% of voters, prompting Mayor Frank Kitts to label the light turnout a "deplorable state of affairs" as "...there were responsible and worthwhile citizens who were prepared to devote their time and money in service to the people". By-elections on the city council were on occasion deferred if a substantial majority of the council agreed to fill the vacancy by appointment, resulting in the highest polling unsuccessful candidate at the previous election being appointed to the council unless there is a public demand for a poll to be held (known as extraordinary vacancies). This arrangement has happened several times such as in 1973 when Olive Smuts-Kennedy resigned her seat and Seton Nossiter was appointed to replace her, in 1979 when Irvine Yardley resigned and was replaced with Tala Cleverley after several higher polling candidates declined the appointment, and in 1985 when Leone Harkness resigned and her council seat which was taken by Bruce Harris.

Two Mayors first entered the Council via by-elections; John Luke (in 1905) and Celia Wade-Brown (in 1994).

List

1901–86
Between 1901 and 1986 municipal elections in Wellington were conducted at large. The following is a list of by-elections held to fill vacancies on the Wellington City Council at large:

Key

1986–present
Since 1986 municipal elections in Wellington have been held via a Wards system of local electoral districts. The following is a list of by-elections held to fill vacancies on the Wellington City Council under the ward system:

Key

Results

1904 by-election

1905 by-election

1906 by-election

1910 by-election

1912 by-election

1920 by-election

1922 by-election

1926 by-election

1927 by-election

1933 by-election

1936 by-election

1949 by-election

1955 by-election

1960 by-election

1969 by-election

1987 by-election, Otari Ward

1987 by-election, Karori Ward

1989 by-election, Southern Ward

1991 by-election, Southern Ward

1994 by-election, Onslow Ward

1994 by-election, Southern Ward

1996 by-election, Southern Ward

1997 by-election, Northern Ward

2000 by-election, Eastern Ward

2017 by-election, Southern Ward

Notes

References

Politics of the Wellington Region
Wellington City Council
Wellington City Council
New Zealand politics-related lists